Ioannis Tsilis (born 15 July 1986, in Ioannina) is a Greek rower.  He competed at the 2012 Summer Olympics in the men's four, finishing in 4th place.

He was again part of the Greek coxless men's four team at the 2016 Summer Olympics, taking eighth place.

References

External links
 

1986 births
Living people
Greek male rowers
Rowers at the 2012 Summer Olympics
Rowers at the 2016 Summer Olympics
Olympic rowers of Greece
Survivor Greece contestants
World Rowing Championships medalists for Greece
European Rowing Championships medalists
Rowers from Ioannina